Ethinylestradiol/cyproterone acetate (EE/CPA), also known as co-cyprindiol and sold under the brand names Diane and Diane-35 among others, is a combination of ethinylestradiol (EE), an estrogen, and cyproterone acetate (CPA), a progestin and antiandrogen, which is used as a birth control pill to prevent pregnancy in women. It is also used to treat androgen-dependent conditions in women such as acne, seborrhea, excessive facial/body hair growth, scalp hair loss, and high androgen levels associated with ovaries with cysts. The medication is taken by mouth once daily for 21 days, followed by a 7-day free interval.

Medical uses
EE/CPA is used as a combined birth control pill to prevent ovulation and pregnancy in women. It is also approved and used to treat androgen-dependent conditions in women such as acne, seborrhea, hirsutism, female pattern hair loss, and hyperandrogenism due to polycystic ovary syndrome.

Available forms
EE/CPA comes in the form of oral tablets and contains 35 or 50 μg EE and 2 mg CPA per tablet. It is taken once daily for 21 days, followed by a 7-day free interval.

Side effects
Side effects of EE/CPA include dysmenorrhea (10.2%), breast tension or tenderness (6.5%), headache (5.2%), nervousness (4.4%), chloasma (4.2%), depressed mood (3.4%), decreased libido (3.1%), varicosities (2.9%), nausea (1.9%), edema (1.7%), and dizziness (1.1%). The incidence of depression with EE/CPA is the same as that with other birth control pills.

Blood clots
The risk of venous thromboembolism with EE/CPA-containing birth control pills is similar to that with EE and gestodene-, desogestrel-, and drospirenone-containing birth control pills and about 50 to 80% higher than with EE and levonorgestrel-containing birth control pills. The absolute risk of venous thromboembolism with EE/CPA-containing birth control pills is about 1.2 to 9.9 per 10,000 women-years.

Pharmacology

EE is a synthetic estrogen, or an agonist of the estrogen receptors, the biological target of estrogens like estradiol. It also has functional antiandrogenic effects by decreasing the circulating free fractions of androgens. CPA is a progestin (synthetic progestogen), or an agonist of the progesterone receptors, the biological target of progestogens like progesterone. It also acts as an antiandrogen, or as an antagonist of the androgen receptor, the biological target of androgens like testosterone and dihydrotestosterone. However, it is thought that the antiandrogenic activity of CPA may only be significant at higher doses than are present in birth control pills. Both EE and CPA have antigonadotropic effects and act as contraceptives in women by suppressing ovulation. The antigonadotropic effects of EE and CPA also contribute to the antiandrogenic efficacy of the medication by suppressing androgen production by the ovaries.

History
CPA/EE-containing birth control pills were developed by 1975 and were first introduced for medical use in 1978. They originally contained 50 μg EE (Diane); subsequently, the EE dosage was decreased to 35 μg in a new "low-dose" preparation in 1986 (Diane-35).

Society and culture

Generic names
Co-cyprindiol, a shortened form of combination of cyproterone acetate and ethinylestradiol, is a generic name of EE/CPA. It is also known by its former developmental code names SHB 209 AB (Diane) and SHB 209 AE (Diane-35). The developmental code name SH-81041 referred to a combination of high-dose 100 mg CPA and 40–50 μg EE administered in a reverse sequential regimen.

Brand names
Brand names of EE/CPA include Diane and Diane-35, as well as Adco-Fem, Alisma, Althea, Ancea, Anuar, Avancel, Axira, Bella HEXAL, Bellgyn, Bellune, Brenda-35 ED, Chloe, Clairette, Claudia, Co-Cyprindiol, Cybelle, CyEstra-35, Cypestra-35, Cyprelle, Cyprest, Cypretil, Cypretyl, Cyproderm, Cyprodiol, Cypromix, Dafne-35, Daphne, Dialider, Diane mite, Diane-35 ED, Dianette, Diclin, Dinac, Diva-35, Dixi, Dixi-35, Drina, Elestra, Elisamylan, Elleacnelle, Erika-35, Esdian, Estelle, Estelle-35, Evashine, Evépar,  Evilin, Facetix, Femina, Feminac, Feminil mite, Frauline, Giane, Giane-35, Ginet, Ginette, Gynelle, Gyneplen, Gynofen, Holgyeme, Isbela, Jennifer-35, Juliet-35 ED, Juliette, Jene, Lady-Ten, Laila-35 ED, Linface, Lunar, Manoane, Midane, Mileva, Minerva, Morea sanol, Neynna, Nortin, OC-35, Selene, Sucee, Syndi, Tess, Visofid, Vreya, Xylia, Zinnia, and Zyrona.

Availability

EE/CPA is available widely throughout the world, including in Europe, North America, South America, East Asia, South Asia, Southeast Asia, and Oceania. It is notably not available in the United States or Japan.

See also
 Estradiol valerate/cyproterone acetate
 List of combined sex-hormonal preparations

References

External links
 
 

Bayer brands
Combined estrogen–progestogen formulations
Cyproterone acetate